A crew neck (crewneck or crew-neck) is a type of shirt or sweater that has a round neckline and no collar, often worn with other layers. The name dates back to 1939 and was named after a type of sweater worn by rowers.

The T-shirt crew neck was developed in 1932 as an undergarment that would absorb sweat and prevent shoulder pads of American football players from causing chafing. The U.S. Navy was the first of the U.S. armed forces to adopt the crew-neck T-shirt or "Gob Shirt".

References 

Tops (clothing)
Necklines